The Judo at the 2015 European Youth Summer Olympic Festival contest was held at the Judo Academy of Georgia in Tbilisi, Georgia on 28 July, 2015.

Results
Source:

Boys

Girls

References

External links
 

2015
2015 European Youth Summer Olympic Festival
EYOF
European 2015